Senator True may refer to:

Diemer True (born 1946), Wyoming State Senate
John M. True (1838–1921), Wisconsin State Senate